Benedikt Eppelsheim is a German instrument maker of extreme high- and low-voiced woodwind instruments. He is the inventor and exclusive manufacturer of the soprillo, a piccolo saxophone an octave above the B♭ soprano saxophone, as well as improved modern redesigns such as the tubax, which is a narrow-bored, more compact modification of the contrabass and subcontrabass saxophone, and the contraforte in collaboration with Guntram Wolf, an improved and redesigned contrabassoon. He also makes standard bass and contrabass saxophones and contrabass clarinets. He builds sarrusophones and subcontrabass saxophones on special order.

Eppelsheim lives in Munich, Germany.

See also
Contrabass clarinet
Contraforte
Soprillo
Subcontrabass saxophone
Tubax

External links
 

German musical instrument makers
Clarinet makers
Year of birth missing (living people)
Businesspeople from Munich
Living people